Little Man, What Now? is a 1934 pre-Code American drama film directed by Frank Borzage and starring Margaret Sullavan. It is based on the novel of the same name by Hans Fallada. The novel had been turned into a German film the previous year. The film was a box-office disappointment for Universal.

Plot
In Germany in the 1930s, a young couple are struggling against poverty. Hans is a small business agent. He is happily married to Emma, whom he affectionately calls "lämmchen" (small lamb). They must keep their marriage a secret in order for Hans to retain his job, as his boss wants him to marry the boss' daughter. However, Hans loses his job when the truth emerges. Hans and Emma stay with his stepmother in bustling Berlin to find success. Hans secures a small job in a department store. Hans and Emma discover that his stepmother is really a notorious madam who runs an exclusive brothel.

Cast
 Margaret Sullavan as Emm "Lammchen" Pinneberg
 Douglass Montgomery as Hans Pinneberg
 Alan Hale as Holger Jachman
 Catherine Doucet as Mia Pinneberg (as Catharine Doucet)
 DeWitt Jennings as Emil Kleinholz
 G.P Huntley as Herr Heilbutt (as G.P. Huntley Jr.)
 Muriel Kirkland as Marie Kleinholz
 Fred Kohler as Karl Goebbler
 Mae Marsh as Wife of Karl Goebbler
 Donald Haines as Emil Kleinholz Jr.
 Christian Rub as Herr Puttbreese
 Alan Mowbray as Franz Schluter

References

External links

1934 films
1934 drama films
American black-and-white films
American drama films
American remakes of German films
Films based on German novels
Films directed by Frank Borzage
Films set in 1930
Films set in 1931
Films set in 1932
Films set in Germany
Great Depression films
Universal Pictures films
1930s English-language films
1930s American films
Adaptations of works by Hans Fallada